Ángel Famiglietti (7 September 1927 – 11 August 2001) was a Panamanian weightlifter. He competed in the men's featherweight event at the 1960 Summer Olympics.

References

External links
 

1927 births
2001 deaths
Panamanian male weightlifters
Olympic weightlifters of Panama
Weightlifters at the 1960 Summer Olympics
Sportspeople from Panama City
Pan American Games medalists in weightlifting
Pan American Games silver medalists for Panama
Weightlifters at the 1955 Pan American Games
Weightlifters at the 1959 Pan American Games
20th-century Panamanian people
21st-century Panamanian people